Eniola Akinbo  (born 9 December 1985), known professionally as Niyola, is a Nigerian singer and songwriter.

Early life
Akinbo was born on 9 December 1985, in Lagos, Nigeria. The youngest of ten children, she sang in church with her siblings and was inspired to pursue a career in music after attending a Funmi Adams concert. Niyola emerged runner up in the Amen Starlet competition in 2000.

Career 
She began her professional music career in 2005 and was briefly affiliated with eLDee’s Trybe Records. Following her stint at Trybe, she signed a production deal with Make Sum Noise Entertainment. Niyola’s first three singles "Me n U (In Da Club)", "No More" and "Dem Say" were released under the imprint. In 2012, Niyola signed a record deal with Empire Mates Entertainment. On 22 May 2013, she released the single "Toh Bad", her first release under the label.

Discography
Niyola (2008)

Filmography 

 Swallow (2021)

Awards and nominations

See also

 List of Nigerian musicians

References

External links

Nigerian women musicians
Yoruba women musicians
21st-century Nigerian singers
Nigerian soul singers
English-language singers from Nigeria
Yoruba-language singers
The Headies winners
1985 births
Living people
Singers from Lagos
21st-century women musicians
Nigerian film actresses
Yoruba actresses
21st-century Nigerian actresses